Peter Kurth (born 4 April 1957) is a German actor. He won the 2016 German Film Award for Best Actor for portraying a former boxer diagnosed with amyotrophic lateral sclerosis in the drama film A Heavy Heart.

Early life
Kurth was born on 4 April 1957 in Güstrow, Mecklenburg-Vorpommern, East Germany. Growing up in Goldberg, he frequently visited the local movie theater, later citing it as an influence on his decision to become an actor. He attended the state drama school in Rostock from 1978 to 1981.

Career
He then moved to Karl-Marx-Stadt (Chemnitz), where he performed at Städtisches Theater. He moved to Hamburg in 2000 to perform at the Thalia Theater. He joined the Maxim Gorki Theater in Berlin in 2006, and later transferred to the Stuttgart Drama Theater.

Kurth was named Actor of the Year by the German theater magazine Theater heute in 2014. Kurth prepared extensively for the role, gaining  in the months before filming to physically resemble a former boxer, before losing his newly-gained weight over the course of the 35-day shoot to portray Herbert's ALS progression. Scott Roxborough of The Hollywood Reporter called Kurth's portrayal of Herbert an "acting master class".

In 2018, Kurth was nominated for the Deutscher Fernsehpreis award for Best Actor, for his role as Detective Bruno Wolter in the German neo-noir television series Babylon Berlin.

Personal life
Kurth is married and has two children.

Selected filmography

References

External links 

1957 births
20th-century German male actors
21st-century German male actors
German male film actors
German male stage actors
German male television actors
Living people